Nalhati Junction is a junction station in Nalhati in the Indian state of West Bengal.

History
The Nalhati Junction station building was built in 1892 as a part of private railway line (Nalhati–Azimganj).
The structure of the station was made of bricks and mortar and its roof was made of wooden beams,
purlins and tiles, which have been damaged.

Platforms
Nalhati Junction station has 5 platforms having capacity of 14 coach+1 engine among them two 1A and 1B platform for branch line. It is a standard on ground structure with roof. Platform number 3 and 2 for up & down main line respectively and 1 for down loop line.

New construction

Two new constructions were made recently at Nalhati Junction station: platform 1B and a long footbridge. Platform 1B situated near the station which serves all the trains coming from Azimganj towards Rampurhat. The footbridge connects platforms 3, 2, 1 and 1A with the booking office.

Gallery

References

Railway stations in Birbhum district
Howrah railway division
Railway junction stations in West Bengal